WCSR and WCSR-FM are radio stations located in Hillsdale, Michigan. They operate on the frequencies of 1340 kHz at 500 watts in the daytime and 250 watts at night & 92.1 MHz at 6,000 watts ERP.

History
WCSR began in 1955 as WBSE, a 100-watt AM station with studios on the corner of Howell Street and McCollum Street in downtown Hillsdale. In 1962 the station moved to their current location on West Street and upgraded their power to 500 watts as well as changing their call letters to the current WCSR. In 1974, the station licensed WCSR-FM 92.1, a 6,000-watt station. In April 2019, a license was granted for the translator W258DE-FM 99.5 to WCSR-AM.  The stations were simulcast until February 28, 2020.  On February 28, 2020, WCSR-AM & W258DE-FM 99.5 launched the country format, 99-5 The Dale.

Current management
WCSR is owned by McKibbin Media Group, Inc. and operated by general manager Dennis Worden, operations manager and afternoon host Bob Flynn, and sales manager and midday host Juli Morgan.

Format
WCSR's programming is varied, and is best described as the format once known as "full service". Much of the day's airtime is devoted to local news and discussions relating to it, including full local newscasts at the top of each hour.

WCSR is well known for their public interest programs, including the weekday morning "Community Spotlight," a local feature for non-profits to highlight their events. Other notable programs include the daily broadcasts of Michigan Ag Today, the "Pet Rescue" animal lost and found program (which, from time to time, may feature the occasional farm animal) and the Saturday "The County Extension Report," which is a service of the Michigan State University Hillsdale County Extension Office. On Sundays, a variety of religious programming can also be heard.

The station is also home of Hillsdale College Charger and Hillsdale High School Hornet athletics, mainly football and men's basketball, and is a member of the Detroit Tigers, Detroit Lions and Motor Racing Network radio networks. The station also airs a variety of sporting events from Hillsdale County's several local public and private schools.

The music the station plays is a Greatest Hits format, and Sunday mornings are home to the long-time local favorite "Big Band Sunday" music block. During evening and weekend dayparts, the station airs Westwood One's Variety Pop format via satellite.

WCSR programming was also heard in Hillsdale on translator W258AO at 99.5 FM between 2008 and 2009. That translator was eventually sold and moved to another location, ending the 99.5 simulcast.

Effective February 27, 2020, WCSR, WCSR-FM, and translator W258DE were sold by WCSR, Inc. to McKibbin Media Group for $675,000. On February 28, 2020, WCSR 1340 AM/W258DE split from its simulcast with WCSR-FM and changed their format to country, branded as "99.5 The Dale".

Sources
Michiguide.com - WCSR History
Michiguide.com - WCSR-FM History

External links

CSR
Mainstream adult contemporary radio stations in the United States
Country radio stations in the United States
Radio stations established in 1955
1955 establishments in Michigan
Hillsdale, Michigan